Ingrid Louise Visser (4 June 1977 – 14 May 2013) was a Dutch female volleyball player, a member of the Netherlands women's national volleyball team in 1994–2011, a participant of the 1996 Olympic Games and 1995 European Champion.

Career

National team
Visser debuted in the Dutch volleyball team in 1994 in a friendly match against Ukraine. In 1995 she won the title of European Champion after winning the final match against Croatia 3–0 in the Netherlands. She was a member of the Dutch women's team at the 1996 Olympic Games in Atlanta, United States. Her team took fifth place in the Olympic tournament. In 2007, Visser received the golden federation's pin because of her record status as an international and her merits for volleyball in the Netherlands. On 4 October 2009, the Netherlands, including Visser, won the silver medal of the 2009 European Championship in Poland. They lost the final match against Italy 3–0. In total she played five World Championships, nine European Championships and the Olympics. From 1994 to 2011 Visser played 514 matches with the national team, which is a record number for a Dutch player in any team sports. Officially she ended her volleyball career on 4 February 2012.

Death
On 13 May 2013, Visser and her boyfriend Lodewijk Severein disappeared shortly after checking into a hotel in the city of Murcia, Spain. They were supposed to meet a doctor the next day but failed to turn up, and the authorities were alerted. Their rental car was found on a city street more than a week later. Their bodies were found on 27 May 2013 in a shallow grave in a lemon grove, two weeks after they disappeared in the region. The pair had been abducted, tortured and killed. Spanish police arrested Juan Cuenca Lorente, ex-director of volleyball club CAV Murcia 2005, and Romanian nationals Valentin Ion and Constatin Stan. The police stated that there had been "certain business disagreements" between the murdered couple and the three men under arrest. Severein and Cuenca had planned to exploit a marble quarry, but these plans never materialized and Severein had requested several hundred thousand Euros of his investment to be returned. During the trial, Valentin Ion admitted to being present during the murder and that it took place on 14 May. After two years of investigation, the Spanish prosecution sought a 50-year prison sentence. 

In November 2016 Valentin Ion and Juan Cuenca Lorente were sentenced to a 34-year prison term, but on appeal in March 2017 the prison terms were increased to 40 years.

See also
List of solved missing person cases

Sporting achievements

Clubs

CEV Champions' League
  2003/2004 - with CV Tenerife

CEV Challenge Cup
  2000/2001 - with Vicenza Volley

National championships
 1995/1996  Dutch Cup, with VVC Vught
 1995/1996  Dutch Championship, with VVC Vught
 1996/1997  Dutch Cup, with VVC Vught
 1996/1997  Dutch Championship, with VVC Vught
 2002/2003  Spanish Championship, with CV Tenerife
 2003/2004  Spanish Championship, with CV Tenerife
 2003/2004  Spanish Cup, with CV Tenerife
 2004/2005  Spanish Championship, with CV Tenerife
 2004/2005  Spanish Cup, with CV Tenerife
 2005/2006  Spanish Championship, with CV Tenerife
 2005/2006  Spanish Cup, with CV Tenerife
 2007/2008  Dutch Championship, with TVC Amstelveen
 2007/2008  Dutch Cup, with TVC Amstelveen
 2010/2011  Spanish Cup, with CAV Murcia 2005

National team
 1995  CEV European Championship
 2007  FIVB World Grand Prix
 2009  CEV European Championship

Individually
 2004 CEV Champions League - Best Blocker

References

External links

  
 

1977 births
2010s missing person cases
2013 deaths
Dutch expatriate sportspeople in Spain
Dutch people murdered abroad
Dutch women's volleyball players
Missing person cases in Spain
Olympic volleyball players of the Netherlands
People murdered in Spain
Sportspeople from Gouda, South Holland
Volleyball players at the 1996 Summer Olympics
Female murder victims
Expatriate volleyball players in Brazil
Expatriate volleyball players in Italy
Expatriate volleyball players in Spain
Expatriate volleyball players in Russia
Expatriate volleyball players in Azerbaijan
Middle blockers
Dutch expatriate sportspeople in Brazil
Dutch expatriate sportspeople in Italy
Dutch expatriate sportspeople in Russia
Dutch expatriate sportspeople in Azerbaijan
Dutch torture victims